Guecha warriors (Spanish: güechas or gueches) were warriors of the Muisca Confederation in the Tenza Valley, Ubaque valley and Altiplano Cundiboyacense in the pre-Colombian era. The Guecha warrior was chosen for his merit in attitude and physique rather than by class. He was recognised by his unique status in society and his adornment with gold, feathers and inks.

Etymology
In the Chibcha language spoken by the Muisca people, the word Güechá has a number of possible meanings. The syllable güe may mean "people", "I killed", "house" or "place". The syllable chá may mean "man" or "male". Hence, güechá may mean "man of the house", "man of the people", or "man who causes death". Güechá may also mean "the brother from another mother" or "uncle".

Selection process
The güechá warriors were an elite troop of Hamza soldiers. The warriors were chosen from the soldiers of the zipa (ruler of the southern Muisca Confederation). A noble lineage was not required for selection. Rather, exemplary service as a warrior may provide entry to the noble classes as a cacicas. The Güechá had to be courageous. They had to be able to work around rigid societal rules and those of an absolute monarchy. The güechá position was not hereditary; selection was only on merit.

Features
The warriors were a privileged group, esteemed for their toughness, and bravery. Their endeavours earned them rewards such as cacicazgos (chiefdoms). Those who fell in battle received posthumous honors. For instance, certain balsams were applied to their bodies and their bodies were carried on the shoulders of their fellow warriors. It was believed the presence of a dead warrior's body could infuse other warriors with life so they might fight again.

Appearance
The Franciscan friar, Pedro Simón (1578  1620) described the warriors as "men of great physique, bodies, bold, loose, determined and vigilant". Lucas Fernández de Piedrahita (1624  1688) a catholic prelate described the warriors as "brave and determined men, with big beautiful physiques, lightness and skill". Unlike the common men, the warriors wore their hair very short and were allowed to wear gold beads and ornaments through edge-pierced ears, nose and lips.

The warriors carried clubs, darts, spears, bows and arrows, and slingshots. They took Panche and Calima slaves with them to war. The men went into combat with curled plumes of parrot feathers, and wide ribbons of fine gold encrusted with emeralds. They wore bracelets and fine coral and gold beads. Inks and Jagua tattoos were also used.

See also

 History of Colombia
 Muisca warfare
 Eagle warrior, Aztec
 Jaguar warrior, Aztec
 Tairona
 Zenú

References

Bibliography

Further reading
 Aguado, Pedro de, 1957, History Collection, Library of the Presidency of Colombia, Bogotá, National Press
 Alcedo, Antonio, 1967, Gazetteer-History of the West Indies or America, 4 vols., Library of Spanish Authors, Madrid, Editions Atlas
 Castellanos, Juan de, 1955, Elegías de varones ilustres de Indias, Library of the Presidency of Colombia. Bogotá, Editorial A.B.C.
 Fernández de Oviedo, Gonzalo, 1959, General and Natural History of the Indies, 5 vols.
 Fernáasfdasdfndez de Piedrahita, Lucas, 1881, General History of the conquest of the New Kingdom of Granada, Bogota, Printing of Medardo Rivas
 Pérez González, Stella Maria, 1987, Chibcha dictionary and grammar, manuscript of the National Library of Colombia, transcription and study, Bogota, Instituto Caro y Cuervo
 Simón, Pedro, 1953, New histories of the conquests of the mainland in the West Indies, 5 vols., Colombian Authors Library, Ministry of Education, Bogota Bolivar Editions
 Uricoechea, Ezequiel, 1871, grammar, vocabulary, catechism and confessional of the Chibcha language as ancient manuscripts and unpublished anonymous, increased correjidos, Paris, Maisonneuve i Cia
 Velandia, Robert, 1979-1982, Historical Encyclopedia of Cundinamarca, 5 vols. Authors Library Cundinamarca, Bogota, National Cooperative Graphic Arts

History of the Muisca
Warriors of Central and South America